Arroyofresno is a station on Line 7 of the Madrid Metro. It is located in fare Zone A.

Completed in 1999 under the name Arroyo del Fresno, the station did not open to the public for many years due to the lack of development in the area.

With developments being built nearby, this station opened to public on 23 March 2019.

History
The station was built along with six other stations as part of the expansion of Line 7 from Valdezarza to Pitis. The expansion cost 25 billion pesetas (150 million euros) and was completed in 1999, two months before the regional elections.

References 

Line 7 (Madrid Metro) stations
Railway stations in Spain opened in 2019